is a former Japanese football player. She played for Japan national team.

Club career
Tomei was born in Gifu on 1 June 1972. She played for Iga FC Kunoichi (formerly Prima Ham FC Kunoichi) from 1988 to 2000. The club won L.League championship in 1995 and 1999. She was also selected Best Eleven 5 times (1994, 1995, 1996, 1997 and 1999).

National team career
In December 1993, Tomei was selected Japan national team for 1993 AFC Championship. At this competition, on 6 December, she debuted against Philippines. She also played at 1994, 1998 Asian Games, 1995 and 1997 AFC Championship. She was a member of Japan for 1995, 1999 World Cup and 1996 Summer Olympics. She played 43 games and scored 6 goals for Japan until 1999.

National team statistics

References

External links
 

1972 births
Living people
Tenri University alumni
Association football people from Gifu Prefecture
Japanese women's footballers
Japan women's international footballers
Nadeshiko League players
Iga FC Kunoichi players
1995 FIFA Women's World Cup players
Olympic footballers of Japan
Footballers at the 1996 Summer Olympics
Asian Games medalists in football
Footballers at the 1994 Asian Games
Footballers at the 1998 Asian Games
Women's association football defenders
Asian Games silver medalists for Japan
Asian Games bronze medalists for Japan
Medalists at the 1994 Asian Games
Medalists at the 1998 Asian Games
1999 FIFA Women's World Cup players